Sri Aurobindo International School is a school in Patiala, India. It was named after Sri Aurobindo, an Indian poet, nationalist and freedom fighter. The school also has an Ashram in which a few orphans live, where they are given all the facilities for free in the name of god.

References

External links
 Sri Aurobindo International School

International schools in India
High schools and secondary schools in Patiala
Schools affiliated with the Sri Aurobindo Ashram